The 2014–15 Top League Challenge Series was the 2014–15 edition of the Top League Challenge Series, a second-tier rugby union competition in Japan, in which teams from regionalised leagues competed for promotion to the Top League for the 2015–16 season. The competition was contested from 7 December 2014 to 25 January 2015.

Honda Heat won promotion to the 2015–16 Top League, while Kamaishi Seawaves, Kyuden Voltex and Mitsubishi Sagamihara DynaBoars progressed to the promotion play-offs.

Competition rules and information

The top two teams from the regional Top East League, Top West League and Top Kyūshū League qualified to the Top League Challenge Series. The regional league winners participated in Challenge 1, while the runners-up participated in Challenge 2. The winner of Challenge 2 also progressed to a four-team Challenge 1.

The top team in Challenge 1 won automatic promotion to the 2015–16 Top League, while the other three teams qualified to the promotion play-offs.

Qualification

The teams qualified to the Challenge 1 and Challenge 2 series through the 2014 regional leagues.

Top West League

The final standings for the 2014 Top West League were:

 Honda Heat qualified for Challenge 1.
 Osaka Police qualified for Challenge 2.

Top East League

The final standings for the 2014 Top East League were:

 Mitsubishi Sagamihara DynaBoars qualified for Challenge 1.
 Kamaishi Seawaves qualified for Challenge 2.

Top Kyūshū League

The final standings for the 2014 Top Kyūshū League were:

 Chugoku Electric Power, Kyuden Voltex and Mazda Blue Zoomers qualified to the Second Phase.
 Kagoshima Bank were relegated to lower leagues.

 Kyuden Voltex qualified for Challenge 1.
 Chugoku Electric Power qualified for Challenge 2.

Challenge 1

Standings

The final standings for the 2014–15 Top League Challenge 1 were:

 Honda Heat won promotion to the 2015–16 Top League.
 Kamaishi Seawaves, Kyuden Voltex and Mitsubishi Sagamihara DynaBoars progressed to the promotion play-offs.

Matches

The following matches were played in the 2014–15 Top League Challenge 1:

Challenge 2

Standings

The final standings for the 2014–15 Top League Challenge 2 were:

 Kamaishi Seawaves progressed to Challenge 1.

Matches

The following matches were played in the 2014–15 Top League Challenge 2:

See also

 2014–15 Top League
 Top League Challenge Series

References

2014-15 Challenge
2014–15 in Japanese rugby union
2014–15 rugby union tournaments for clubs